José Monteiro de Macedo (born 2 June 1982) is a Guinea-Bissauan footballer who plays as a central defender.

Personal life
Monteiro has also acquired Swedish citizenship. He is the uncle of Portuguese international footballer Eder.

References

External links
 
 
 
  

1982 births
Living people
People from Algiers
Citizens of Guinea-Bissau through descent
Bissau-Guinean footballers
Guinea-Bissau international footballers
Allsvenskan players
Hammarby Talang FF players
Hammarby Fotboll players
Bissau-Guinean expatriate footballers
Expatriate footballers in Sweden
People with acquired Swedish citizenship
Värmdö IF players

Association football central defenders